Gary Knecht {born September 29, 1939) is a faculty member at Azusa Pacific University and former college football coach. Knecht has served as an assistant coach at several universities and as the head coach at UC Riverside from 1970 to 1971 and at Walla Walla Community College from 1976 to 1983. During his career as a head coach, Knecht compiled an overall record of six wins, 13 losses and one tie (6–13–1) at Riverside and 52 wins, 19 losses and one tie (52–19–1) at Walla Walla.

Coaching career
In February 1970, Knecht was promoted to the head coach position at Riverside after the resignation of Pete Kettela. In March 1973, Knecht resigned as head coach after he led Riverside to an overall record of six wins, 13 losses and one tie (6–13–1). From Riverside, Knecht served as a defensive assistant at Cal Poly Pomona in 1972 before he was hired as the linebackers coach at Idaho in February 1973.

He stayed at Idaho through the 1975 season before he resigned in February 1976 to become the head coach at Walla Walla Community College. At Walla Walla, Knecht led the Warriors to an overall record of 52 wins, 19 losses and one tie (52–19–1) during his tenure as head coach from 1976 through 1983. In 1984, he served as athletic director at Walla Walla before he was hired at Oregon State as an assistant coach in 1985. Knecht finished his coaching career at Azusa Pacific where he served as defensive coordinator from the 1995 through 2003 seasons.

Head coaching record

References

1939 births
Living people
American football ends
Azusa Pacific Cougars football coaches
Cal Poly Pomona Broncos football coaches
Delta College Mustangs football players
Idaho Vandals football coaches
Oregon State Beavers football coaches
Sacramento State Hornets football coaches
UC Riverside Highlanders football coaches
UC Santa Barbara Gauchos football coaches
UC Santa Barbara Gauchos football players
Walla Walla Warriors football coaches
High school football coaches in California
People from Kern County, California
People from Lodi, California
Coaches of American football from California
Players of American football from California